André Oliveira Farias (born February 10, 1979), or simply André Oliveira, is a Brazilian football defender.

Career
André Oliveira began his career in football in the divisions of the base of Vasco da Gama. Then, the team drew the attention of Uberlândia, was hired to integrate the division has professional team.
A quarterback who led the team back four of the interior, André Oliveira stood out among the players and the team saw and joined the American player on his roster.
Games played by the team, but ended up going to where Ituano disputed the Campeonato Brasileiro Serie B
In 2008 André Oliveira was part of the team Macaé under the command of coach Tita. The staff was not very well in the tournament, but drew the attention of Vasco da Gama. During the Brazilian Championship of 2008 André Oliveira was integrated into the cast of the Vasco da Gama. Returning to his club base, André Oliveira vague search between the owners and try to take the team from relegation zone. In January 2011 he was hired by Santa Cruz to compose the group you want to get access to the series C.

Honours

Club
 Santa Cruz
Pernambuco State League: 2011

External links
 

1979 births
Living people
Brazilian footballers
Brazilian expatriate footballers
Association football forwards
Macaé Esporte Futebol Clube players
Santa Cruz Futebol Clube players
Sportspeople from Niterói